The Stamford Bridge, also known as Bridge No. 48-102-010, is a historic bridge in rural Mellette County, South Dakota, southeast of Stamford.  Built in 1930, it is a three-span Bedstead Pony Truss bridge, carrying a local road over the White River, off County Road Ch 1.  Each span measures  in length, and the rest on two concrete piers and two concrete abutments with wing walls.  The deck consists of steel I-beams, with wooden stringers topped by steel plates.  The bridge is the longest Bedstead truss bridge in the state, and one of a modest number of surviving bridges built using this type of truss.

The bridge was replaced in 2017.

The bridge was listed on the National Register of Historic Places in 1993.

See also
List of bridges on the National Register of Historic Places in South Dakota
National Register of Historic Places listings in Mellette County, South Dakota

References

Road bridges on the National Register of Historic Places in South Dakota
Bridges completed in 1930
Buildings and structures in Mellette County, South Dakota
National Register of Historic Places in Mellette County, South Dakota
Steel bridges in the United States
Pony truss bridges